Club Balonmano Mar Alicante is a Spanish team handball club from Alicante, that plays in Segunda División Nacional, the 3rd-tier handball league for women in Spain. Founded in 1996, the team has achieved its best results in recent years. They were the runners-up of the 2010 Spanish Cup and Supercup and the 2011 Cup Winners' Cup (in their second international appearance following their debut in the 2010 EHF Cup), falling short to SD Itxako and Ferencvárosi TC respectively.

Honours
Copa ABF: 1
Winners: 2010–11
EHF Cup Winners' Cup: 0
Runners-up: 2011
Copa de la Reina: 0
Runners-up: 2010
Supercopa de España: 0
Runners-up: 2010

Season to season

15 seasons in División de Honor

Notable players 

  Vanesa Amorós
  Nuria Benzal
  Laima Bernatavičiūtė
  Mercedes Castellanos
  Véronique Démonière
  Fabiana Diniz
  Marizza Faría
  Beatriz Fernández
  Anna Manaut
  Carmen Martín
  María Muñoz
  María Núñez
  Isabel Ortuño
  Linda Pradel
  Ana de Sousa

References

External links
 Official Website

Spanish handball clubs
Handball clubs established in 1996
Sport in Alicante
Sports teams in the Valencian Community